Richard Restwold (died 1475), of High Head Castle, Cumbria, Sindlesham, Berkshire and Crowmarsh Gifford, Oxfordshire, was an English politician.

He was a Member (MP) of the Parliament of England for Cumberland in May 1421, for Berkshire in 1425, 1432, 1442 and 1445, and for Oxfordshire in 1439. He was the son of Richard Restwold, also an MP for Cumberland.

References

Year of birth missing
1475 deaths
English MPs May 1421
People from Cumberland
People from Winnersh
People from Oxfordshire
High Sheriffs of Berkshire
High Sheriffs of Oxfordshire
High Sheriffs of Wiltshire
English MPs 1425
English MPs 1432
English MPs 1442
English MPs 1445
English MPs 1439